Potito Starace won the event the last time it was played, in 2013. This year, he lost in the first round.

Daniel Muñoz de la Nava won the title, defeating Matteo Donati in the final, 6–2, 6–1.

Seeds

Draw

Finals

Top half

Bottom half

References
 Main Draw
 Qualifying Draw

Tennis Napoli Cup - Singles
2015 Singles